Juhayman ibn Muhammad ibn Sayf al-Otaybi (16 September 1936 – 9 January 1980), was a Saudi terrorist and soldier who in 1979 led the seizure of the Great Mosque of Mecca, Islam's holiest mosque, to protest against the Saudi monarchy.

Juhayman said that his justification for the siege was that the House of Saud had lost its legitimacy through corruption and imitation of the West, an echo of his father's charge in 1921 against former Saudi king Ibn Saud. Unlike earlier anti-monarchist dissidents in the kingdom, Juhayman attacked the Saudi ulama for failing to protest against policies that betrayed Islam, and accused them of accepting the rule of an infidel state and offering loyalty to corrupt rulers "in exchange for honors and riches".

On 20 November 1979, the first day of the Islamic year 1400, the Great Mosque of Mecca was seized by a well-organized group of 400 to 500 men under al-Otaybi's leadership. A siege lasted more than two weeks before Saudi special forces broke into the mosque. French special forces provided a special tear gas (CS gas) which prevents aggressiveness and slows down breathing. Juhayman was publicly executed by the Saudi authorities in Mecca on 9 January 1980.

Biography
Juhayman al-Otaybi was born in al-Sajir, Al-Qassim Province, a settlement established by King Abdulaziz to house Ikhwan Bedouin tribesmen who had fought for him. This settlement (known as a hijra) was populated by members of his tribe, the 'Utaybah, one of the most pre-eminent tribes of the Najd region. Many of Juhayman's relatives participated in the Battle of Sabilla during the Ikhwan uprising against King Abdulaziz, including his father and grandfather, Sultan bin Bajad al-Otaybi. Juhayman grew up aware of the battle and of how, in their eyes, the Saudi monarchs had betrayed the original religious principles of the Saudi state. He finished school without fluent writing ability, but he loved to read religious texts.

He served in the Saudi Arabian National Guard from 1955 to 1973. He was thin and 6'2 (188 cm) in height according to his friends in the National Guard. His son, Hathal bin Juhayman al-Otaybi, who works for the National Guard, was promoted to the rank of Colonel in 2018.

Education
Otaybi did not complete primary education, but he attended school until the fourth grade. After his military service he moved to Medina. There he attended religious courses at the Islamic University, where he met with Muhammad ibn Abdullah Al Qahtani.

Otaybi, upon moving to Medina, joined the local chapter of a Salafi group called Al-Jamaa al-Salafiya al-Muhtasiba (The Salafi group that commands right and forbids wrong), which was founded in the mid-1960s by several of Muhammad Nasiruddin al-Albani's disciples. Many of the group's members and scholars were either of Bedouin descent or non-Saudis residents, and therefore marginalized in the religious establishment. Their activism was at least partially motivated by this marginalization. Abd al-Aziz ibn Baz used his religious stature to arrange fundraising for the group, and Otaybi earned money by buying, repairing and re-selling cars from city auctions.

Otaybi lived in a "makeshift compound" about a half hour's walk to the Prophet's Mosque, and his followers stayed in a nearby dirt-floored hostel called Bayt al-Ikhwan ("House of the Brothers"). Otaybi and his devotees obeyed an austere and simple lifestyle, searching the Quran and Hadith for scriptural evidence of what was permissible not only for their beliefs but in their day-to-day lives. Otaybi was perturbed by the encroachment of Western beliefs and Bid‘ah (innovation) in Saudi society to the detriment of (what he believed to be) true Islam. He opposed the integration of women into the workforce, television, the immodest shorts worn by football players during matches, and Saudi currency with an image of the King on it.

By 1977, ibn Baz had departed to Riyadh and Otaybi became the leader of a faction of young recruits that developed their own—sometimes unorthodox—religious doctrines. When older members of the Jamaa travelled to Medina to confront Otaybi about these developments, the two factions split from each other. Otaybi attacked the elder sheikhs as government sellouts and called his new group al-Ikhwan.

In the late 1970s, he moved to Riyadh, where he drew the attention of the Saudi security forces. He and approximately 100 of his followers were arrested in the summer of 1978 for demonstrating against the monarchy, but were released after ibn Baz questioned them and pronounced them harmless.

He married both the daughter of Prince Sajer Al Mohaya and the sister of Muhammad ibn Abdullah Al Qahtani.

His doctrines are said to have included:
 The imperative to emulate the Prophet's example—revelation, propagation, and military takeover.
 The necessity for the Muslims to overthrow their present corrupt rulers who are forced upon them and lack Islamic attributes since the Quran recognizes no king or dynasty.
 The requirements for legitimate rulership are devotion to Islam and its practice, rulership by the Holy Book and not by repression, Qurayshi tribal roots, and election by the Muslim believers.
 The duty to base the Islamic faith on the Quran and the sunnah and not on the equivocal interpretations (taqlid) of the ulama and on their "incorrect" teachings in the schools and universities.
 The necessity to isolate oneself from the sociopolitical system by refusing to accept any official positions.
 The advent of the Mahdi from the lineage of the Prophet through Husayn ibn Ali to remove the existing injustices and bring equity and peace to the faithful.
 The duty to reject those who associate partners with God (mushrikeen), particularly those who worship Ali, Fatimah and Muhammad.
 The duty to establish a puritanical Islamic community which protects Islam from unbelievers and does not court foreigners.

See also

 Mecca
 'Utaybah
 Sayyid Qutb
 Salafi movement
 Wahhabism
 Deobandi
 List of Mahdi claimants

References

Works cited

 
 
 
 Lacroix, S., & Holoch, G. (2011). Awakening Islam: The Politics of Religious Dissent in Contemporary Saudi Arabia. Cambridge, Mass: Harvard University Press.

External links 
 Rejectionist Islamism in Saudi Arabia: The Story of Juhayman al-ʿutaybi Revisited

1936 births
1980 deaths
People executed by Saudi Arabia by decapitation
Saudi Arabian rebels
Executed Saudi Arabian people
20th-century executions by Saudi Arabia
Salafi jihadists
Saudi Arabian Salafis